The Chiayi Confucian Temple is a Confucian temple in Chiayi Park, East District, Chiayi City, Taiwan.

History
The temple was originally built in 1706. In 1815, the temple restoration stele was inscribed and erected. In 1907, an earthquake occurred in the city and the Confucian Tablet was moved to Wenchang Hall and later re-housed at Nanmen Shengshen Temple. In 1961, the Confucian Temple was rebuilt inside Chiayi Park and the Temple Restoration Stele was re-erected in the garden of the new temple. In 1964, the new Confucian Temple was completed and the Confucian Tablet was returned to Dacheng Hall.

Transportation
The temple is accessible within walking distance south east of Beimen Station of the Alishan Forest Railway.

See also
 Chiayi Cheng Huang Temple
 Chiayi Jen Wu Temple
 Temple of Confucius
 List of temples in Taiwan

References

1706 establishments in Taiwan
Confucian temples in Taiwan
Tourist attractions in Chiayi